Kenneth Ørbæk (born ) is a Danish wheelchair curler.

He participated in the 2006 Winter Paralympics where Danish team finished on fifth place.

Teams

Mixed doubles

References

External links 

Living people
1960 births
Danish male curlers
Danish wheelchair curlers
Paralympic wheelchair curlers of Denmark
Wheelchair curlers at the 2006 Winter Paralympics